KRXI-TV (channel 11) is a television station in Reno, Nevada, United States, affiliated with the Fox network. It is owned by Sinclair Broadcast Group, which provides certain services to primary sports-formatted independent station and secondary MyNetworkTV affiliate KNSN-TV (channel 21, owned by Deerfield Media) and NBC affiliate KRNV-DT (channel 4, owned by Cunningham Broadcasting) through separate joint sales and shared services agreements (JSA/SSA). However, Sinclair effectively owns KRNV as the majority of Cunningham's stock is owned by the family of deceased group founder Julian Smith. The three stations share studios on Vassar Street in Reno; KRXI-TV's transmitter is located on Peavine Peak.

History
The station began operations on New Year's Day 1996, taking the Fox affiliation from KAME which was owned by a separate subsidiary of Cox Enterprises. KRXI-DT2 added RTV on January 7, 2008. The station was depicted in the episode "Drive" of The X-Files as part of a police chase that took place during the show.

On July 20, 2012, one day after Cox Media Group purchased WAWS and WTEV in Jacksonville, Florida, and KOKI-TV and KMYT-TV in Tulsa, Oklahoma, from Newport Television, Cox put KRXI-TV (along with the LMA for KAME-TV) and sister stations WTOV-TV in Steubenville, Ohio, WJAC-TV in Johnstown, Pennsylvania, and KFOX-TV in El Paso, Texas (all in markets that are smaller than Tulsa), plus several radio stations in medium to small markets, on the selling block. On February 25, 2013, Cox announced that it would sell the four television stations, and the LMA for KAME, to Sinclair Broadcast Group. The Federal Communications Commission (FCC) granted its approval on April 30, 2013, one day after it approved the sale of sister station, KRXI. The sale was finalized on May 2, 2013. Sinclair would subsequently purchase the non-license assets of a third Reno station, KRNV-DT, on November 22, 2013. Sinclair could not buy KRNV-DT outright because Reno has only six full-power stations—three too few to legally permit a duopoly. With the sale of KRNV's license to Cunningham, Sinclair now controls half of those stations. The sale also created a situation in which a Fox affiliate is the nominal senior partner in a duopoly involving an NBC affiliate and a "Big Three" station.

Programming

Syndicated programming
In addition to the Fox network schedule, syndicated programs featured on KRXI-TV include Modern Family, The Big Bang Theory, Mike & Molly, TMZ on TV, and The Real among others.

News operation
KRXI simulcasts newscasts from former sister station and current Fox owned-and-operated station KTVU in Oakland, California. It includes an hour-long prime time news (weeknights at 10:00 p.m.). All newscasts are presented in high definition from KTVU's studios at Jack London Square in Downtown Oakland. During the nightly news at 10:00 p.m., there were local weather cut-ins provided by AccuWeather meteorologists (weeknights at 10:40 p.m. and weekends at 10:40 p.m.). These forecast segments, taped in advance, originate from headquarters on Science Park Road in State College, Pennsylvania. Both of the weather cut-ins ended on June 17, 2014 (weeknights) and on June 20, 2014 (weekends), in favor of the local weather and news cut-ins provided by KRNV-DT.

On October 4, 2010, KRXI partnered with the Independent News Network (INN) to produce a weeknight newscast called Fox 11 News: Eleven at Eleven, with the slogan "Local News. Less Time." Initially it aired in an abbreviated format for fifteen minutes (including commercials). This was unlike traditional broadcasts seen in the time slot on Reno's big three stations. The newscast then changed to a half-hour format, in addition to altering the slogan to "Local News. Your World." The newscast was taped in advance from INN's facilities on Tremont Avenue in Davenport, Iowa. The news anchors, meteorologist, and sports anchor were provided by the centralized news operation and other personnel from INN filled-in as needed. The newscast ended on April 4, 2014, in favor of the 11:00 p.m. newscast on KRNV-DT.

KRXI maintained two local reporters based in Reno who contributed content to the show. This was the first time the station had ever had a news department of its own even though it was very small with a skeleton crew based out of the station's studios. Fox 11 News Eleven at Eleven was streamed live on KRXI's website and there was also on demand video of the weeknight broadcasts.

Following the sale of KRXI to Sinclair and the company's subsequent acquisition of the non-license assets of KRNV-DT, Sinclair stated its intention to end KRXI's news share agreement with KTVU in favor of locally produced newscasts. However, Cox discontinued its agreement to air the morning and noon newscasts on May 14, 2014. The local morning newscast was added on August 25, 2014. The local noon newscast was moved from KRNV-DT to KRXI-TV on June 1, 2015 to comply with FCC rules stipulating that a company providing more than 15% of a station's programming per week would have an "attributable interest" in the station, thus counting as ownership.

Notable former on-air staff
 Mark Curtis – anchor and reporter for KTVU (1996–2007); now with WOWK-TV
 Mark Hyman – national political commentator for Sinclair Broadcast Group's Behind the Headlines (2013–2018); now retired
 Lloyd LaCuesta – reporter for KTVU (1996–2012); now retired
 Dennis Richmond – anchor and reporter for KTVU (1996–2008); now retired
 Frank Somerville – anchor and reporter for KTVU (1996–2021; formerly with KSTP-TV)

Technical information

Subchannels
The station's digital signal is multiplexed:

Analog-to-digital conversion
KRXI-TV shut down its analog signal, over VHF channel 11, on June 12, 2009, the official date in which full-power television stations in the United States transitioned from analog to digital broadcasts under federal mandate. The station's digital signal remained on its pre-transition UHF channel 44. Through the use of PSIP, digital television receivers display the station's virtual channel as its former VHF analog channel 11.

Translators

References

External links
 Official website

Fox network affiliates
Charge! (TV network) affiliates
Antenna TV affiliates
Sinclair Broadcast Group
Television channels and stations established in 1996
RXI-TV
1996 establishments in Nevada
Low-power television stations in the United States